Idriz Toskić (born 12 October 1995) is an Italian-born Montenegrin footballer who plays as a defensive midfielder for Serie D club Team Nuova Florida. Toskić has played for the Montenegro U-17 and U-19 national football teams.

Toskić was born in Molfetta, 25 km from Bari, and holds Italian citizenship.

Career

Club career
In July 2013 Toskić was sold to Chievo outright for €320,000. However, on 1 September 2013 Bari bought him back in a co-ownership deal for €250,000, signing a 5-year contract. He returned to Chievo in a temporary deal immediately. In June 2014 Chievo bought Toskić outright, for €400,000, with Andrea De Falco moved to opposite direction also for €400,000. In January 2015 Toskić was signed by Monza in a temporary deal.

In January 2020, Toskić returned to Italy and joined Serie D club Team Nuova Florida.

References

External links
 

1995 births
Living people
People from Molfetta
Italian people of Montenegrin descent
Association football midfielders
Montenegrin footballers
Montenegro youth international footballers
Montenegro under-21 international footballers
S.S.C. Bari players
A.C. ChievoVerona players
A.C. Monza players
FK Dečić players
A.S. Bisceglie Calcio 1913 players
KF Skënderbeu Korçë players
FK Kom players
Serie B players
Serie C players
Serie D players
Montenegrin First League players
Kategoria Superiore players
Montenegrin expatriate footballers
Expatriate footballers in Albania
Montenegrin expatriate sportspeople in Albania
Footballers from Apulia
Sportspeople from the Metropolitan City of Bari